Parviturbo fenestratus is a species of a rare, smallsea snail, a marine gastropod mollusk in the family Skeneidae.

Description
The size of the shell varies between 1 mm and 2 mm.

Distribution
This species occurs in the Central Mediterranean Sea; in the Atlantic Ocean off the Canary Islands and of Tanger, Morocco.

References

 Gofas, S.; Le Renard, J.; Bouchet, P. (2001). Mollusca, in: Costello, M.J. et al. (Ed.) (2001). European register of marine species: a check-list of the marine species in Europe and a bibliography of guides to their identification. Collection Patrimoines Naturels, 50: pp. 180–213

External links
 

fenestratus
Gastropods described in 1896